Thapar is a surname of Punjabi Khatri.

Notable people
Notable people bearing the surname Thapar include:

 Sukhdev Thapar (1907–1931), Indian freedom fighter
 Amul Thapar,  Federal Judge of the United States Court of Appeals for the Sixth Circuit.
 Amrita Thapar, model, Miss India 2005
 Anita Thapar, Welsh psychiatrist
 Gautam Thapar (1960-), Indian businessman
 Karam Chand Thapar (1900–1963), founder of Thapar Group of companies
 Karan Thapar (1955–), television interviewer, son of General P. N. Thapar
 Kavya Thapar, Indian film actress and model
 L. M. Thapar (1930–2007), head of L. M. Thapar group of companies, son of Karam Chand Thapar
 General Pran Nath Thapar (1906–1975), fifth Chief of Army Staff of the Indian Army
 Romesh Thapar (1922–1991), journalist and political commentator
 Romila Thapar (1931–), historian, sister of Romesh Thapar
 Valmik Thapar, conservationist and natural historian, son of Romesh Thapar

References

Indian surnames
Surnames of Indian origin
Punjabi-language surnames
Hindu surnames
Khatri clans
Khatri surnames